Ponyo, or Ponyo-Gongwang after its two dialects, is a Sino-Tibetan language spoken in Burma. Ponyo is spoken in 19 villages of Lahe Township, Naga Self-Administered Zone (formerly administered as part of Hkamti District), Sagaing Division, Myanmar (Ethnologue). Dialects are Ponyo and Gongwang, with high mutual intelligibility between the two.

Ponyo and Htang Ngan (Leinong) are close to Khiamniungan.

Alternate names include Gongvan, Gongwang, Gongwang Naga, Manauk, Mannok, Ponyo, Ponyo Naga, Pounyu, Saplow, Solo, Tsawlaw (Ethnologue).

Dialects
Ethnologue lists two main dialects.
Ponyo (Manauk, Mannok, Ponnyio, Pounyu)
Gongwang (Gongvan, Saplo, Saplow, Solo, Tsaplo, Tsawlaw)

References

Sal languages
Languages of Myanmar